Héctor Chang Lara is a Venezuelan mathematician working at CIMAT, Guanajuato unit, in Mexico. Chang received his BA in Mathematics from Simon Bolivar University in Venezuela, his MS from the University of New Mexico and his PhD in mathematics from the University of Texas at Austin, advised by Luis Caffarelli. Chang works in partial differential equations, specializing in elliptic and parabolic differential equations as well as integro-differential equations and free boundary problems.

Publications 
Further Time Regularity for Non-Local, Fully Non-Linear Parabolic Equations. (CPAM)
Further time regularity for fully non-linear parabolic equations. (Math. Research Letters).
Estimates for concave, non-local parabolic equations with critical drift. (Journal of Integral Equations and Applications)
Hölder estimates for non-local parabolic equations with critical drift. (Journal of Differential Equations).
Shape Theorems for Poisson Hail on a Bivariate Ground. (Journal of Advances in Applied Probability).
Boundaries on Two-Dimensional Cones. (Journal of Geometric Analysis).
Regularity for solutions of nonlocal parabolic equations II. (Journal of Differential Equations).
Regularity for solutions of non local parabolic equations. (Calculus of Variations and Partial Differential Equations).
Regularity for solutions of nonlocal, non symmetric equations. (Ann. Inst. H. Poincaré Anal. Non Linéaire).

References 

Year of birth missing (living people)
Living people
Columbia University faculty
Venezuelan mathematicians
University of New Mexico alumni
University of Texas at Austin College of Natural Sciences alumni
Simón Bolívar University (Venezuela) alumni